This list contains notable people associated with Woodward High School in Cincinnati, Ohio, including alumni and current and former faculty.

Alumni

Art & entertainment
Karen Ackerman (1969) – author of children's literature
Alice Williams Brotherton (1848-1930) – writer
Marty Callner (1964) – music video director
Leo Mielziner (1887) – artist and scenic designer, father of Jo Mielziner
Harry Shokler (1914) – artist
Richard Stoltzman (1960) – classical clarinetist

Athletics
Daryl Boston (1981) – former Major League Baseball player
Ezzard Charles (1942) –  The "Cincinnati Cobra", American professional boxer and former World Heavyweight Champion
Dante Craig – National Golden Gloves Champion Lightweight Champion 1995, Welterweight Champion 1999) and contender in boxing at the 2000 Summer Olympics
Leon Durham (1976) – former Major League Baseball player (1980–1989)
Ray Edwards (2003) – defensive lineman drafted by the Minnesota Vikings
John Jackson (1983) – offensive tackle
Ed Jucker (1936) – former head basketball coach at the University of Cincinnati and later coach for two seasons of the Cincinnati Royals of the NBA.
C. J. McDiarmid (c. 1886) – executive with the St. Louis Browns and Cincinnati Reds
Antwan Peek (1998) – linebacker for the Cleveland Browns
Abdul Salaam (1971) – former defensive tackle with the New York Jets' as part of the "New York Sack Exchange." Known as "Larry Faulk" while attending Woodward, he changed his name to Abdul Salaam, which means "Soldier of Peace," in 1977.
Ed Shuttlesworth (1970) (born 1952) –  leading rusher for the Michigan Wolverines football teams of 1972 and 1973; third leading rusher in the Canadian Football League in 1974
Clem Turner (1964) –  NFL running back for Cincinnati Bengals and Denver Broncos and pro wrestler.

Government and politics
Ted Berry (1924) – 1st African-American Valedictorian at Woodward (1924); president of the Cincinnati branch of the NAACP (1932-1946); 1947-1961 served on the NAACP Ohio Committee for Civil Rights Legislation; first black assistant prosecuting attorney for Hamilton County; first African American mayor of Cincinnati (1972)
David H. Bailey, United States Consul in Hong Kong (1870-1878) and Consul General in Shanghai (1879-1880)
Mark L. Mallory (1980) – Mayor of Cincinnati
Lafayette F. Mosher (1843) – Associate Justice of the Oregon Supreme Court, Oregon State Senator
O'dell Owens – reproductive endocrinologist, Hamilton County Coroner, President of Cincinnati State Technical and Community College, nonprofit executive
William Howard Taft (1874) – 27th President of the United States and 10th Chief Justice of the United States Supreme Court, the only person to hold both offices

Military
Henry V. Boynton (1854) – Union Army officer during the Civil War, Medal of Honor recipient

Education
William Strunk Jr. – Cornell University English professor and author of The Elements of Style.
Dr. Ronald Crutcher – President Emeritus of Wheaton College (Massachusetts) and accomplished cellist (member of the Klemperer Trio).  President-elect (July 1, 2015) of the University of Richmond.
 Nelson Glueck (1916) – was an American rabbi, academic and archaeologist. He served as president of Hebrew Union College from 1947 until his death, and his pioneering work in biblical archaeology resulted in the discovery of 1,500 ancient sites.

Science
Charles Henry Turner (ca 1887) – etymologist and first African American to receive a graduate degree at the University of Cincinnati and Ph.D. from the University of Chicago

Faculty
William Holmes McGuffey (mid-1840s), author of the McGuffey Readers, one of America's first textbooks.
Joseph Ray (1807-1855), author of Ray's Arithmetic

References

Woodward High School (Cincinnati, Ohio people)
Woodward High School